Alto Jequitibá is a Brazilian municipality in the state of Minas Gerais. It belongs to the mesoregion of Zona da Mata and to the microregion of Manhuaçu. The municipality has a population of 8,301 (2020) and its area is 152 km².

Geography
Settled in the highplanes among offshoots from the Pico da Bandeira, the third highest mountain of Brazil nearing 3,000 meters, in the Ocidental side of the Caparaó range of mountains. It is in the Brazil's Southeast in the bush's zone.

Demographics
Alto Jequitibá is one of the few mainly Protestant cities of Minas Gerais, mainly Presbyterian.

References

External links
  Information and pictures about the city

Municipalities in Minas Gerais